Ziyaret is a Turkish, Persian and Urdu word of Arabic origin [زيارة], meaning "visit." It may refer to the following places in Turkey:

 Ziyaret, Amasya, a town in the district of Amasya, Amasya Province
 Ziyaret, Kahta, a village in the district of Kahta, Adıyaman Province
 Ziyaret, Kozluk, a village in the district of Kozluk, Batman Province
 Ziyaretköy, Kurucaşile, a village in the district of Kurucaşile, Bartın Province
 Ziyaret, Şavşat, a village in the district of Şavşat, Artvin Province
 Ziyaret, Ergani
 Ziyaret, Sur
 Ziyaret Tepe, the modern location of Tushhan, an Assyrian city.

See also
 Ziarat (disambiguation), the original Persian word